Grigori Alexandrovich Machtet (1852, Lutsk — 1901, Yalta) was a Russian-language writer of Ukrainian origin. He is the author of the well-known song "Tormented by Grievous Bondage".

Machtet with his associates went to America to organize a land commune there. Soon due to financial hardships he had to become a hired man. Having returned to Russia in 1874 he got involved in a revolutionary movement.

In 1876 Machtet was imprisoned to the Petropavloskaya fortress, and then exiled to Siberia.

Machtet wrote his most famous works, among which his novel "One Warrior In The Field", the story "His Hour Has Come", a series of Siberian stories, and some articles published in the "Native Stories" magazine.

1852 births
1901 deaths
People from Lutsk
People from Volhynian Governorate
19th-century novelists from the Russian Empire
Novelists from the Russian Empire
Male writers from the Russian Empire
Ukrainian writers
19th-century male writers from the Russian Empire